was a Japanese samurai and military commander of the Sengoku period. He was the lord of the Obama Castle. Sadatsuna belonged under the command of Tamura Kiyoaki. But Sadatsuna switched from the Tamura clan to the Ashina clan and he became independent of the Tamura clan. Later, he served the Date clan and became a senior retainer.

References

Samurai
1545 births
1610 deaths